The Paul Mellon Centre for Studies in British Art is a scholarly centre in London devoted to supporting original research into the history of British Art. It was founded in 1970 and endowed by a gift from Paul Mellon. Since 1996, it has been situated at 16 Bedford Square in a Grade I listed building. This building houses an outstanding library of 26,000 publications focused on British art and architecture, and over 25 collected archives which include papers of eminent art historians such as Ellis K. Waterhouse, Oliver Millar, Brian Sewell and Brinsley Ford. It also holds the records of its own institutional archives, including a growing oral history collection. The centre compiled its own photographic archive from 1970 to 1996 and now also holds the Tate photographic archive. All of these research collections are available to consult in the centre's Public Study Room.

As well as being incorporated as a British educational charity, the centre is part of Yale University and provides teaching in London for Yale students, through the successful Yale-in-London scheme. The centre supports a publication programme through Yale University Press and co-ordinates its activities with the sister institution, the Yale Center for British Art in New Haven.

The centre administers a comprehensive programme of grants and fellowships designed to support research into the history of British art, and hosts workshops, symposia, conferences and regular series of seminars.

The centre is a registered charity under English law and is a member of the Association of Research Institutes in Art History.

Publications 

The Paul Mellon Centre underwrites the production costs of publications concerned with the study of British art and architecture. The books are distributed by Yale University Press. In 2015 the centre launched an online and open access journal, British Art Studies, that is copublished with the Yale Center for British Art.

The centre published an online catalogue raisonné of the artist Richard Wilson to coincide with the tercentenary of the artist's birth. In 2016, the centre published another catalogue raisonné of the artist Francis Towne.

In March 2019, the Paul Mellon Centre's open access, peer-reviewed digital publication The Royal Academy Summer Exhibition: A Chronicle, 1769-2018 was nominated for a Webby Award and won the People's Vote award in the art website category.

Directors

References

News articles
 New York Times Article An Anglophilic Yankee Aristocrat and His Finds Across the Pond
 New York Times Article Voracious Anglophile

External links
Official website
Richard Wilson Online catalogue raisonné
British Art Studies online journal
The Royal Academy Summer Exhibition: A Chronicle, 1769–2018
Francis Towne Online catalogue raisonné
Library & Photographic Archives Catalogue
Archive Catalogue

Archives in the London Borough of Camden
Visual arts publishing companies
British art
Education in the London Borough of Camden
1970 establishments in the United Kingdom
Arts organisations based in the United Kingdom
Charities based in London